Smith's Cloud is a high-velocity cloud of hydrogen gas located in the constellation Aquila at Galactic coordinates l = 39°, b = −13°. The cloud was discovered in 1963 by Gail Bieger, née Smith, who was an astronomy student at Leiden University in the Netherlands.

Properties

The cloud is apparently moving towards the disk of the Milky Way at 73 ± 26 kilometers per second. Smith's Cloud is expected to merge with the Milky Way in 27 million years at a point in the Perseus arm. Astronomers believe it will strike the Milky Way disk at a 45° angle, and its impact may produce a burst of star formation or a supershell of neutral hydrogen.

Projecting the cloud's trajectory backwards through time, it is estimated that it had passed through the disk of the Milky Way some 70 million years ago. To have survived this previous encounter, astronomers have suggested that it is embedded inside a massive dark matter halo. The fact that it survived this previous encounter means that it is likely to be much more massive than previously thought, and may be a candidate for being a dark galaxy. In this scenario it would be a failed dwarf galaxy, with the ingredients to form a stellar galaxy, but few if any detectable stars. However, chemical abundance measurements from the Hubble Space Telescope argue against this hypothesis; these measurements show that the Smith Cloud has an average metallicity of one half of the solar value, indicating that its gas originates in the Galaxy, not from an extragalactic source. The cloud's orbit and metallicity are both consistent with an origin in the outer disk of the Milky Way. The mechanism by which this gas was released is not known.

References

External links 

 
 

High-velocity clouds
Dark galaxies
Aquila (constellation)
?